Albert Edward Fishwick (1899–1961) was an English footballer. He scored 61 goals in 188 league games in a ten-year career in the Football League, playing for Plymouth Argyle, Blackpool, Port Vale, and Tranmere Rovers. He helped Vale to the Third Division North title in 1929–30.

Career
Fishwick played for Leyland, Hamilton Central and Chorley (in two spells), before joining Plymouth Argyle. He made his debut in the Third Division South, in a 1–0 defeat at Northampton Town on 10 November 1923. He signed with Blackpool in 1925. He made his debut for Frank Buckley's team on 24 October, in a 4–0 victory over Wolves at Bloomfield Road. He scored his first (two) goals for the club in the next game – a 4–3 win at South Shields on 31 October. He went on to make a total of 28 league appearances in the 1925–26 campaign. He finished as the team's top scorer, with nineteen goals to his name, helping the "Seasiders" to a sixth-placed finish in the Second Division. The following season, 1926–27, Fishwick made 25 league appearances, scoring thirteen goals in the process, including a hat-trick in the third league game of the season – a 6–1 win at home to Barnsley.

After making six league appearances for Blackpool during the 1927–28 season, Fishwick joined Port Vale in March 1928. His first game was a Potteries derby match on 17 March 1928, which finished goalless. He enjoyed regular football for the rest of the season, scoring once in nine Second Division games. He hit six goals in 15 appearances in 1928–29, as the "Valiants" were relegated into the Third Division North. They came straight back up as champions in 1929–30, with Fishwick scoring four goals in five games. He hit four goals in 12 games in 1930–31, all coming within the space of three games. He was sold to Tranmere Rovers in March 1931 and later returned to his hometown club Chorley. Rovers finished fourth in the Third Division North in 1931–32 and 11th in 1932–33.

Career statistics
Source:

Honours
Port Vale
Football League Third Division North: 1929–30

References
Specific

General
 

1899 births
1961 deaths
Sportspeople from Chorley
English footballers
Association football forwards
Chorley F.C. players
Plymouth Argyle F.C. players
Blackpool F.C. players
Port Vale F.C. players
Tranmere Rovers F.C. players
English Football League players